This is a complete list of the operas and operettas of the French composer Charles Lecocq (1832–1918).

Genres
Lecocq wrote 21 opéras comiques, 12 opéras bouffes, eight opérettes, two 'opérettes bouffes'. two 'opérettes de salon', two 'saynètes', and one each of the following: 'bluette bouffe', 'comédie-musicale', 'féerie', 'folie parée et masquée', 'opéra monologue', 'pantomime', 'scéne', 'vaudeville' and 'vaudeville-opérette'.

List

References
Notes

Sources
Lamb, Andrew (1992), "Lecocq, Charles", vol. 2, p. 1120, in The New Grove Dictionary of Opera, ed. Stanley Sadie (London) . Also available as "Lecocq, Charles. Works" at Oxford Music Online (subscription required).
Opérette page on Lecocq, accessed 14 April 2009

 
Lists of operas by composer
Lists of compositions by composer